The  is a pair of Kofun period burial mounds located in the Yuzukami neighborhood of the city of Ōtawara in Tochigi Prefecture in the northern Kantō region of Japan. Both received protection as a National Historic Site in 1951.The neighborhood has many smaller kofun, including one keyhole-shaped tumulus, seven dome-shaped tumuli and one square-shaped tumulus, which are covered under an Ōtawara City Historic Site designation.

Overview
The Samuraizuka Kofun are both  . They are located on the right bank of the Naka River in the northern end of the Kanto Plain. The kofun were excavated in 1692 by order of Tokugawa Mitsukuni, who kept a detailed illustrated records of the artifacts discovered. The artifacts were later placed in boxes made from Japanese red pine restored to the burial chambers, and the site was backfilled. Tokugawa Mitsukuni attributed the tombs to that of the Nasu Kuni no miyatsuko named "Ataiide" mentioned on a stele dated 689 AD discovered in a shrine in Ōtawara City, which lists the names of prehistoric rulers from the 5th century. 

The Kamisamuraizuka Kofunis the larger tumulus, with a total length of 114 meters. Artifacts included bronze mirrors, fragments of armor, cylindrical beads and iron balls. 

Overall length 114 meters
Posterior portion 60 meters wide x 12 meters high
Anterior portion 52 meters wide x 7 meters high

The Shimosamuraizuka has a total length of 84 meters, and was surrounded by a moat. Artifacts included bronze mirrors, iron swords and Haji ware] pottery. In 1975, the Shimo-Samuraizuka was trench excavated in connection with a land improvement project and more Haji-ware shards were discovered.

Overall length 84 meters
Posterior portion 48 meters wide x 9.4 meters high
Anterior portion 36 meters wide x 5 meters high

These tumuli are considered to have been built around the beginning of the 5th century AD, with the Shimosamuraizuka being the older of the two. They are located a short walk from the "Sajizuka Parking Lot" bus stop on the municipal bus from Nasushiobara Station on the Tōhoku Shinkansen.

See also

List of Historic Sites of Japan (Tochigi)

References

External links

  Ōtawara  city home page 

Kofun
History of Tochigi Prefecture
Ōtawara
Historic Sites of Japan
Shimotsuke Province